Tom Jones (10 September 1904 – 27 January 1944) was an Australian rules footballer who played with Footscray in the Victorian Football League (VFL).		

He was a defender who was recruited from the local district.

Notes

External links 

 

1904 births
1944 deaths
Australian rules footballers from Victoria (Australia)
Western Bulldogs players